Richard Lewis may refer to:

Politicians
 Dick Lewis (politician) (1900–1966), Welsh politician active in England
 Richard Lewis (Australian politician) (1939-2019), Australian politician
 Richard Lewis (English MP) (1627–1706), English landowner and politician
 Richard Lewis (Canadian politician) (1824–1875), mayor of Victoria, British Columbia, 1872
 Richard Lewis (New Zealand politician) (born 1969), New Zealand politician
 Rick Lewis (politician), member of the Oregon House of Representatives

Religious leaders
 Richard Lewis (bishop of Llandaff) (1821–1905), British religious leader
 Richard Lewis (bishop of St Edmundsbury and Ipswich) (1943–2020), British religious leader
 Richard Lewis (priest) (1935–2022), Dean of Wells, 1990–2003

Sportsmen
 Richard Lewis (cricketer, born 1947), former English cricketer
 Richard Lewis (Middlesex cricketer) (1874–1917), English cricketer
 Richard Lewis (tennis and rugby league) (born 1954), British tennis player and sports administrator
 Richie Lewis (born 1966), American baseball player
 Ricky Lewis (born 1982), American soccer player

Others
 Richard Lewis (1808–1831), Welsh defendant a.k.a. Dic Penderyn
 Richard Lewis (born c.1822), Secretary of the Royal National Lifeboat Institution from 1850
 Richard Field Lewis Jr. (1907–1957), American radio network owner
 Richard Lewis (tenor) (1914–1990), Welsh singer
 R. W. B. Lewis (1917–2002), American writer
 Richard D. Lewis (born 1930), British linguist
 Richard Lewis (comedian) (born 1947), American comedian and actor
 Richard B. Lewis (born 1953), American producer
 Rick Lewis (radio personality) (1960–2001), American radio announcer
 Rick Lewis (journalist) (fl. 1990s), British journalist
 Richard Lewis (journalist) (born 1984), British esports journalist and commentator
Richard Lewis (police officer) (fl. 21st century), British chief constable
 Richard J. Lewis (fl. 21st century), Canadian film director
 Dick "Rocko" Lewis (Richard Henry Lewis III, 1908–1966), American entertainer

See also
 Richard Louis (born 1964), sprinter